Annovka is a rural locality (a selo) and the administrative center of Annovskoye Rural Settlement, Korochansky District, Belgorod Oblast, Russia. The population was 724 as of 2010. There are 2 streets.

Geography 
Annovka is located 24 km southeast of Korocha (the district's administrative centre) by road. Pritsepilovka is the nearest rural locality.

References 

Rural localities in Korochansky District